Marie-Ange Casalta (born June 5, 1990) is a French journalist and television presenter.

Early life and education 
Marie-Ange Casalta was born in Toulouse in the department of Haute-Garonne and is from Corsican origin. She graduated with a bilingual degree in journalism (DESS) at the Sorbonne.

Television career 
She started working in the United States for CNN, in the United Kingdom and the Netherlands. In 2007, she started working for the news channel i>Télé before joining NRJ Paris in 2008 to present a news broadcasting and a talk show.

The same year, she joined the channel W9 the present the investigation program W9 Mag. In April 2009, she co-hosts on the same channel the investigation program Enquête d'action with François Pécheux. From June to August 2009, she briefly presents on M6 the information program C'est positif broadcast at the middle of the day. After the departure of François Pécheux at France 3, she hosts all alone the program Enquête d'action on W9.

Since March 2010, she briefly replaces Estelle Denis and then Faustine Bollaert to host the daily program 100% Mag on M6, especially in Summer 2010 and 2011 in which she travels in different French regions in L'été de 100% Mag.

Personal life 
In 2009, Marie-Ange Casalta married radio host, screenwriter and film producer Romuald Boulanger. She gave birth on June 8, 2014 to her first child, a son named James.

References

External links 

Profile of Marie-Ange Casalta on the official site of M6 

1978 births
Living people
Mass media people from Toulouse
French people of Corsican descent
French television journalists
French television presenters
French women television presenters
French women journalists